The Tamil Nadu Global Investors Meet (TNGIM) is a business summit organised by the Government of Tamil Nadu in Chennai to allow domestic and foreign investment in the state. The first business summit was held in 2015. The latest meeting in 2019 enabled the signing of 304 memorandi of understanding (MoUs) and potential investments worth ₹300,431 crores (US$42 billion).

Focus sectors 
The primary focus sectors are:

 Aerospace and Defence
 Agribusiness and food processing
 Automobile
 Chemicals and Petrochemicals
 Electronics
 Heavy Engineering
 IT and ITES
 Pharmaceuticals and Biotechnology
 Renewable energy
 Skill development
 Textiles

Highlights

First meet 
In 2015, the Meet was organized by Chief Minister J. Jayalalithaa. More than 5,000 delegates attended, signing over 100 MoUs, and raised ₹24,000,000 of investment.

Second meet 
On 23 and 24 January 2019, the second Meet was held at the Chennai Trade Centre. 304 MoUs were signed and potential investments worth ₹300,431 crores (US$42 billion) were made. Adani Group and Indian Oil Corporation committed to invest ₹28,000 crores (US$3.9 billion). The majority of Adani's investment was to make the Kattupalli shipyard a major multipurpose port by increasing its current capacity twelvefold.

Japan announced that All Nippon Airways (ANA) would start daily flights between Narita and Chennai to increase air connectivity to India.

See also 
 Economy of Tamil Nadu
Economy of Chennai

References

External links 

Economy of Tamil Nadu
Economy of Chennai
Business conferences in India
Investment in India
2015 establishments in Tamil Nadu